Lambro is a genus of fungi in the family Sydowiellaceae.

Species
As accepted by Species Fungorum;
Lambro insignis 
Lambro symploci 

Former species;<ref name="Fungorum".>
 L. oharana  = Hypospilina oharana, Valsaceae
 L. stellata  = Metadothella stellata, Hypocreales Order
 L. ulmea  = Stegophora ulmea, Sydowiellaceae

References

External links 

 Lambro at Index Fungorum

Gnomoniaceae
Sordariomycetes genera